In experimental methodology, a round-robin test is an interlaboratory test (measurement, analysis, or experiment) performed independently several times. This can involve multiple independent scientists performing the test with the use of the same method in different equipment, or a variety of methods and equipment. In reality it is often a combination of the two, for example if a sample is analysed, or one (or more) of its properties is measured by different laboratories using different methods, or even just by different units of equipment of identical construction.  

A round-robin program is a measurement systems analysis  technique which uses analysis of variance (ANOVA) random effects model to assess a measurement system.

Round-robin tests regarding occupational safety and health 
Companies are obliged to determine whether hazardous substances are in the air at the workplace by using appropriate measurements. To maintain the quality parameters for analytic procedures, the quality assurance methods are to be applied that are state-of-the-art. The Institute for Occupational Safety and Health of the German Social Accident Insurance (IFA) provides proficiency testing as support and assistance for the measuring stations worldwide for the purpose of self-examination and for the external presentation of quality standards. The PT schemes are conducted according to DIN EN ISO/IEC 17043 and DIN ISO 13528. The IFA organises the proficiency testing schemes in co-operation with the German association of environmental and OSH measurement bodies (BUA) and in collaboration with international partner institutes.

Purpose 
There are different reasons for performing a round-robin test:
 determination the  reproducibility of a test method or process
 verification of a new method of analysis. If a new method of analysis has been developed, a round-robin test involving proven methods would verify whether the new method produces results that agree with the established method.
 providing basis, by interlaboratory testing, for certificates of quantitative analysis on a given material in certified reference materials production.

Further info 
 ASTM E691 Standard Practice for Conducting an Interlaboratory Study to Determine the Precision of a Test Method
 IUPAC:  Round Robin Test on the Molecular Characterization of Epoxy Resins by Liquid Chromatography
 NIST/SEMATEK (2008) Handbook of Statistical Methods

References 

Design of experiments
Statistical hypothesis testing